In the Rectory of the Bizarre Reverend is the debut album by Finnish doom metal band Reverend Bizarre. It was originally released in 2002 and was re-released with a bonus CD titled Return to the Rectory in 2004. The album was released on vinyl by Finnish label Svart Records.

The album title is a homage to King Crimson's 1969 album, In the Court of the Crimson King.

The album art is based on Goya's 1798 painting, Witches' Sabbath.

Track listing

Personnel
 Albert Witchfinder – bass, vocals
 Peter Vicar – guitar
 Earl of Void – guitar, drums
 Francisco Goya – cover painting: Witches' Sabbath

Return to the Rectory
Return to the Rectory was planned to be released as an EP with the name "Reverend Bizarre Blesses You with Fire" by the Reverend Bizarre, but was featured as a bonus CD to the 2004 re-release of In the Rectory of the Bizarre Reverend. A standalone vinyl version was released in 2011.

"Aleister" is an extra track from the recordings of "Harbinger of Metal".

Track listing

"The March of the War Elephants" – 8:17  
"The Festival" – 10:43  
"The Goddess of Doom" – 12:11  
"Aleister" – 11:58  
"For You Who Walk in the Land of the Shadows" – 8:36  
"Dark Sorceress (Autumn Siege)" (Barathrum cover) – 7:30  
"The Wrath of the War Elephants" – 6:34

Personnel
Albert Witchfinder – vocals, bass
Peter Vicar – guitar
Earl of Void – drums, guitar, keyboards

References

Reverend Bizarre albums
2002 debut albums
Season of Mist albums